Yu Yongbo (born September 1931) is a general in the People's Liberation Army of China who served as head of the People's Liberation Army General Political Department from 1992 to 2002. He was a member of the 13th, 14th, and 15th Central Committee of the Chinese Communist Party. He was a delegate to the 8th and 9th National People's Congress.

Biography
Yu was born into a Manchu family in Fu County (now Wafangdian), Liaoning, in September 1931. He enlisted in the Northeast People's Liberation Army in September 1947, and joined the Chinese Communist Party (CCP) in September 1948. He served in the Fourth Field Army and participated in the Liaoshen campaign, Pingjin campaign, and Southwest China campaign. 

In December 1950, he was assigned to North Korea to support the Chinese People's Volunteer Army during the Korean War. He returned to China in November 1952 and served in the 42nd Army of the PLA Ground Force for a long time. 

He became director of the Headquarters Office of Guangzhou Military Region in December 1978, and served until May 1983, when he was appointed political commissar of the 42nd Army. In June 1985, he was transferred to Nanjing Military Region and appointed director of Political Department. In November 1989, he became deputy head of the People's Liberation Army General Political Department, rising to head in October 1992. He retired in March 2003.

He was promoted to the rank of lieutenant general (zhongjiang) in 1988, and general (shangjiang) in 1993.

Awards
 1960 Order of Liberation

References

1931 births
Living people
Manchu politicians
People from Dalian
People's Liberation Army generals from Liaoning
People's Republic of China politicians from Liaoning
Chinese Communist Party politicians from Liaoning
Delegates to the 8th National People's Congress
Delegates to the 9th National People's Congress
Members of the 13th Central Committee of the Chinese Communist Party
Members of the 14th Central Committee of the Chinese Communist Party
Members of the 15th Central Committee of the Chinese Communist Party